In pathology, diastasis is the separation of parts of the body that are normally joined, such as the separation of certain abdominal muscles during pregnancy, or of adjacent bones without fracture.

See also
 Diastasis recti
 Diastasis symphysis pubis
Compare with:
 Diastasis (physiology)

References

Gross pathology